Samgakji Station is a subway station on the Line 4 and Line 6 of the Seoul Metropolitan Subway. The Seoul War Memorial is a short walk away from exits 11 and 12. This station is on the west end of the Yongsan Garrison, which is a short walk from exit 13. Although not connected to this station by a transfer passageway, Namyeong station on Line 1 is a short walk from here.

The Samgakji area was made famous in Korea because of a 1967 song by Bae Ho titled "Return to Samgakji." A statue dedicated to the song was erected in front of the station.

Line 4 is a relative platform with two sides and two sides, while Line 6 is equipped with two island platforms with two front and two island platforms, both of which have screen doors installed on the platform. In the case of Line 4, it was possible to cross the other side through the transit passage, but it has recently been changed to cross. There are 14 exits.

Station layout

Vicinity
Exit 1 : MND Club, Army Club
Exit 5 : Yongsan Fire Station
Exit 8 : Yongsan Elementary School
Exit 12 : Seoul War Memorial
Exit 13 : Ministry of National Defense and Yongsan Garrison, U.S. Army Base

References

Railway stations in South Korea opened in 1985
Seoul Metropolitan Subway stations
Metro stations in Yongsan District